Kraljić, Krajlic is a Croatian surname.  means 'king'. Notable people with the surname include:

Edi Kraljić, Croatian singer
Nina Kraljić (born 1992), Croatian singer-songwriter and voice actress
Peter Kraljic, author of Kraljic matrix

Croatian surnames